Alexander Allan Innes "Zander" Wedderburn (9 May 1935 – 23 February 2017) was a British psychologist and Emeritus Professor of Psychology at the Heriot-Watt University.

Early life 
In May 1935, Wedderburn was born in Edinburgh. 
Wedderburn's father was Alexander Archibald Innes Wedderburn, a lawyer and auditor to the Court of Session. Wedderburn's mother was Ellen Innes Jeans.

Education 
Wedderburn graduated from Exeter College, Oxford in 1959 and was awarded a PhD by Heriot-Watt in 1992.

Career 
Between 1968 and 2000, Wedderburn lectured at Heriot-Watt University in Edinburgh.

After his retirement, Wedderburn founded publishing company Fledgling Press.

Wedderburn taught occupational psychology in the School of Management at Heriot-Watt University, Edinburgh, for 32 years, and was a Professor Emeritus there. Most of his teaching was in the area of making occupational psychology available to business students and engineers, and in his final three years he established a part-time MSc in Occupational Psychology taught jointly with Strathclyde University.

His main research impact was on hours of work and shiftwork, where he became an internationally known authority, building on a British Steel Corporation Fellowship in 1970 to 1972.

His particular interest was in the interface between research and practice, with several measured practical interventions, a ten-year stint as editor of the Bulletin of European Shiftwork Topics, and founding editor of the Shiftwork International Newsletter.  He was President of the British Psychological Society in 2003/2004, only the third occupational psychologist to achieve this in the past fifty years.

He was a Fellow Member of the Working Time Society.

Personal life 
In 1960, Wedderburn married Bridget Johnstone. They have four children and eight grandchildren.

Wedderburn died of oesophageal cancer on 23 February, aged 81.

Works
 Gray J. A. and Wedderburn A. A. I., (1960) "Grouping strategies with simultaneous stimuli".  Quarterly Journal of Experimental Psychology, 12, 180–184.
 Wedderburn, A. A. I. (1967) Social factors in swiftly rotating shifts. Occupational Psychology, 41, 85–107.
 Wedderburn, A. A. I. (1972) Sleep patterns on the 25-hour day in a group of tidal shiftworkers. Studia Laboris et Salutis, 11, 101–106.
 Keenan, A. and Wedderburn, A. A. I., (1975) Effects of non-verbal behaviour of interviewers on candidates' impressions. Journal of Occupational Psychology, 48, 129–132.
 Wedderburn, A. A. I. (1975) EEG and self-recorded sleep of two shiftworkers over four weeks of real and synthetic work. In Experimental Studies of Shiftwork, edited by W. P. Colquhuoun et al., Forschungsberichte des Landes Nordrhein-Westfalen 2513.
 Wedderburn, A. A. I. (1978) Some suggestions for increasing the usefulness of psychological and sociological studies of shiftwork. Ergonomics, 21, 827–833.
 Keenan, A. and Wedderburn, A. A. I. (1980), Putting the boot on the other foot: candidates' descriptions of interviewers. ;;Journal of Occupational Psychology, 53, 81–89
 Wedderburn, A. A. I. (1987) Unintentional falling asleep at work: what can you do about it In Contemporary advances in shiftwork research , ed. Oginski et al., Krakow, Medical Academy.
 Wedderburn, A. A. I. (1987) Sleeping on the job: the use of anecdotes for recording rare but serious events. Ergonomics, 30, 1229–1233.
 Wedderburn, A. A. I. (1991) Guidelines for shiftworkers.  Bulletin of European Shiftwork Topics 3. European Foundation for the Improvement of Living and Working Conditions, Dublin.
 Wedderburn, A. A. I. (1992) How fast should the night shift rotate?  A rejoinder.   Ergonomics, 35, 1447–1451
 Wedderburn A. A. I. and Scholarios, D. (1993) Guidelines for shiftworkers: trials and errors. Ergonomics, 36, 211–217
 Wedderburn, A. A. I. (1993) Teaching grandmothers how to suck eggs: do shiftworkers need rules or guidelines? Ergonomics, 36.
 Wedderburn, A. A. I. (1995) Men and women who like continuous shiftwork are more 'hardy': but what does it mean?  Work & Stress, 9, 206–210.
 Quinn, K. M., King, C., Slawek, K. and Wedderburn, A. A. I. (1995) The effectiveness of an individually tailored health education intervention for 24hr shiftworkers. Paper presented at the XII Symposium on Night and Shiftwork, Connecticut.
 Monk, T. H., Folkarc, S. and Wedderburn A. A. I. (1996) Maintaining safety and high performance on shiftwork. in Applied Ergonomics'', 27, 17–23 
 Wedderburn A. A. I. Rankin D. (2001) An intervention using a self-help guide to improve the coping behaviour of nightshift workers and its evaluation. HSE Books.

References

External links
 Alexander Wedderburn's publishing company Fledgling Press 

1935 births
2017 deaths
Academics of Heriot-Watt University
Alumni of Exeter College, Oxford
British psychologists
British neuroscientists
Presidents of the British Psychological Society